The 2019 Mississippi State Bulldogs baseball team represents Mississippi State University in the 2019 NCAA Division I baseball season. The Bulldogs play their home games at Dudy Noble Field.

Preseason

Preseason All-American teams
1st Team
Jake Mangum – Outfielder (Collegiate Baseball)
Jake Mangum – Outfielder (NCBWA)
2nd Team
JT Ginn – Utility Player (Baseball America) 
Jake Mangum – Outfielder (D1Baseball)

3rd Team
Jake Mangum -"BAMF"  Outfielder (Perfect Game)

SEC media poll
The SEC media poll was released on February 7, 2019 with the Bulldogs predicted to finish in sixth place in the Western Division.

Preseason All-SEC teams

1st Team
Jake Mangum – Outfielder

2nd Team
Tanner Allen – First Baseman

Roster

Schedule and results

† Indicates the game does not count toward the 2019 Southeastern Conference standings.
*Rankings are based on the team's current ranking in the Collegiate Baseball poll.

Starkville Regional

Starkville Super Regional

Record vs. conference opponents

Rankings

MLB Draft

†Small, a redshirt junior, had previously been drafted in the 26th round in 2018.
‡Mangum, a senior, had previously been drafted in the 32nd round in 2018.
§Allen, a sophomore, will return to play for Mississippi State in 2020.

References

Mississippi State
Mississippi State Bulldogs baseball seasons
Mississippi State Bulldogs baseball
Mississippi State
College World Series seasons